Luoyang is a town in Huanjiang Maonan Autonomous County, Guangxi, China.

Administrative division
As of 2021, the town is divided into three communities and twelve villages: 
Luoyang Community
Hongyang Community
Hong'an Community
Tuanjie
Pule
Wenya
Yong'an
Yongquan
Dimeng
Yuhe
Yamai
Jiangkou
Guchang
Hezuo
Miaoshi

History
During the Qing dynasty (1644–1911), it belonged to Si'en County.

In 1933 during the Republic of China, Luoyang Township was set up.

In 1950, it came under the jurisdiction of the 3rd District. In 1959, its name was renamed Luoyang People's Commune and then Luoyang District in 1962. In 1984, it was upgraded to a town.

Geography
The town is situated at the south central of Huanjiang Maonan Autonomous County. The town shares a border with Chuanshan Town and Xianan Township to the west, Da'an Township and Minglun Town to the east, Xunle Miao Ethnic Township to the north, and Si'en Town and Shuiyuan Town to the south.

The Dahuanjiang River flows through the town.

Economy
The town's economy is based on nearby mineral resources and agricultural resources. The main crops are rice and corn. Sugarcane is one of the important economic crops in the region.  The region abounds with lead, zinc, antimony, iron and coal.

Demographics

The 2019 census reported the town had a population of 48,949.

Transportation
The town is crossed by the Provincial Highway S309.

References

Bibliography

 

Divisions of Huanjiang Maonan Autonomous County